Polynoncus brevicollis is a species of hide beetle in the subfamily Omorginae found in Argentina, Bolivia, Paraguay, Peru, Chile, and Colombia.

References

brevicollis
Beetles described in 1822